The 1928 Lehigh Brown and White football team was an American football team that represented Lehigh University as an independent during the 1928 college football season. In its first season under head coach A. Austin Tate, the team compiled a 3–6 record and was outscored by a total of 192 to 57. The team played its home games at Taylor Stadium in Bethlehem, Pennsylvania.

Schedule

References

Lehigh
Lehigh Mountain Hawks football seasons
Lehigh football